Robert Richter is the name of:

 Robert Richter (lens designer) (1886–1956), German lens designer employed by Goerz and Zeiss-Ikon
 Robert Richter (German film producer) (1899–1972), German filmmaker
 Robert Richter (American film producer) (born 1929), American documentary filmmaker
 Robert Richter (lawyer) (born 1946), Australian barrister